Time100 Impact awards are the extension of Times 100 Influential People. The first edition of award was held in March 2022 in Dubai in Museum Of the Future. These awards recognize those who have made a significant impact on their industries and world. The latest edition of award was organized on 2nd October 2022 at the National Gallery Singapore in partnership with Singapore Economic Development Board.

Winners October 2022 edition 
The awards were presented to 4 recipients in different categories.

 Actor and producer Alia Bhatt for her contribution to entertainment industry
 Former James Webb Space Telescope program director Gregory L. Robinson
 Computational geneticist Dr. Pardis Sabeti
 Filipina singer, actress, and columnist Lea Salonga for being a "life-long role model for children of color.

Recipientes March 2022 edition 

 English singer-songwriter, author and activist Ellie Goulding was honored with the award in recognition of her longstanding work toward advancing climate change awareness.

Recipients February 2022 edition 

 Actress and philanthropist Deepika Padukone for her work in mental health struggles and raising awareness through her foundation The Live Love Laugh.
 Sarah Al Amiri, Chairwoman of UAE Space Agency, for her role in helping to take the UAE to Mars.
 British-Ghanaian architect David Adjaye, whose designs include the National Museum of African American History and Culture in the US for his work of reorienting the world’s attention and shining a light on cultures from every corner of the world.
 Nigerian economist Tony Elumelu for his efforts, through his eponymous foundation, in empowering African entrepreneurs to create jobs on the continent.
 Makeup artist Huda Kattan for disrupting what it means to be beautiful
 Musician Will.i.am for his advocacy work on forward-thinking tech and artificial intelligence strategies.

Other awards from Times Group 
Other awards that are presented by Times group Include TIME100 Most Influential People, Person of the Year, Firsts, Best Inventions, World's Greatest Places and premium events including the TIME100 Summit and Gala, TIME100 Health Summit, and TIME100 Next.

References 

American awards